The Biniș is a left tributary of the Glavița in Romania. It discharges into the Glavița near Belinț. Its lower course is part of the Coșteiu-Chizătău Canal between the Timiș and the Bega.

References

Rivers of Romania
Rivers of Timiș County